El Tango en Broadway (English: The Tango on Broadway) is a 1934 American musical film directed by Louis J. Gasnier and starring Carlos Gardel, Trini Ramos, and Blanca Vischer. The film was a Spanish-language production made in the United States, for release to Spanish-speaking audiences at home and abroad without English subtitles. It was released by Paramount Pictures and filmed at the company's New York Studios. Gardel was a popular Argentinian singer of tango music who made a number of films for Paramount before his death in 1935. Like Gardel's other American films, it is not a version of an existing English-language film, but a completely original story. By contrast, most of Hollywood's Spanish language films were remakes of English productions.

Cast
 Carlos Gardel as Alberto Bazán  
 Trini Ramos as Celia  
 Blanca Vischer as Laurita  
 Vicente Padula as Juan Carlos  
 Jaime Devesa as Don Indalecio Bazán  
 Suzanne Dulier as Susana  
 Manuel Peluffo as El hombre blanco  
 Don Alberto as Morales 
 Agustín Cornejo as Cornejo  
 Carlos Spaventa as Carlos  
 Carlos Gianotti as El gaucho  
 José Moriche as Piñata 
 Dan Duryea as Bob - Laurita's Boyfriend

References

Bibliography 
 Nataša Durovicová, Kathleen E. Newman. World Cinemas, Transnational Perspectives. Routledge, 2010.

External links 

1934 films
American musical films
1934 musical films
1930s Spanish-language films
Spanish-language American films
Films directed by Louis J. Gasnier
Paramount Pictures films
American black-and-white films
1930s American films